Telephone numbers in Oman have a country calling code of +968 and an 8-digit National Significant Number (NSN).

Major telecom operators are Omantel, Ooredoo, Awasr, Renna, and Friendi.

Allocations
The 8-digit National Significant Number (NSN) is composed of a 4-digit National Destination Code (NDC), followed by a 4-digit line number.

References

Oman
Telecommunications in Oman